Rashida (Rasceda) is a desert village in the Jalo oasis of the Al Wahat District in the Cyrenaica region in northeastern Libya. In 1951, the population was reported as about 600.

References

External links
"Rashida Map — Satellite Images of Rashida" Maplandia World Gazetteer

 

Oases of Libya
Populated places in Al Wahat District
Cyrenaica